George Albert Ralphs (September 23, 1850 – June 21, 1914) was an American businessman. He founded the Ralphs supermarket chain in Southern California, with the help of his brother Walter.

Early life and career
George Albert Ralphs was born in Joplin, Missouri in 1850. His family moved to California on a prairie schooner and a yoke of oxen when he was a boy. Once he was settled in San Bernardino, George Ralphs was trained as an expert bricklayer and even developed a reputation as “Champion Bricklayer of California.” Ralphs also worked in Los Angeles, after losing an arm in an accident, he gave up bricklaying and found work as a clerk in a small grocery store. In 1873, he had saved enough money to purchase his own grocery at Sixth and Spring Streets. He opened his first store, Ralphs and Francis, in 1873, in the Spring Street Financial District of Los Angeles with S. A. Francis. From then on, Ralphs prospered, operating three of the largest stores in Los Angeles. In 1879, Ralphs bought Francis's share of the company for $2,000 and took his brother Walter as a business partner and renamed their business to "Ralphs Brothers". The company was incorporated in 1909 as Ralphs Grocery Company. Today, Ralphs supermarkets are owned by the Kroger Company, with locations in Los Angeles, Orange, San Diego, Ventura, Riverside and San Bernardino counties.

Personal life
Ralphs married Wallula Von Keith on July 23, 1896. The couple had two children, Annabell and Albert George. Albert later became the vice-president and manager of Ralphs Grocery Company.

Death
On June 21, 1914, Ralphs was with his family for a weekend trip to the San Bernardino Mountains. While taking a walk with his wife in Waterman's Canyon, Ralphs stopped to rest on top of a boulder. As he attempted to help his wife up to sit beside him, the boulder became dislodged and began rolling down the mountain side along with Ralphs. In the process, one of his legs got caught and was severely injured. He was taken to Ramona Hospital (now known as Community Hospital of San Bernardino) where he underwent surgery to have his injured leg amputated. Ralphs awoke from the surgery and spoke to his wife for a few minutes, but died of shock later that afternoon.

Ralphs's body was shipped back to Hollywood where he and his family lived. His funeral was held on June 24. He was buried in Evergreen Cemetery in Los Angeles.

References

1850 births
1914 deaths
19th-century American businesspeople
20th-century American businesspeople
Accidental deaths in California
American amputees
Burials at Evergreen Cemetery, Los Angeles
People from Joplin, Missouri
People from San Bernardino, California
People from Hollywood, Los Angeles
Businesspeople from Los Angeles
American grocers